The Wollaton Wagonway (or Waggonway), built between October 1603 and 1604 in the East Midlands of England by Huntingdon Beaumont in partnership with Sir Percival Willoughby, has sometimes been credited as the world's first overground wagonway and therefore regarded as a significant step in the development of railways. Its primacy has been recently questioned because of a wagonway built at Prescot, near Liverpool, sometime around 1600 and possibly as early as 1594. Owned by Philip Layton, this line carried coal from a pit near Prescot Hall to a terminus about half a mile away. Also, a wagonway at Broseley in Shropshire was probably earlier.

The wagonway was the earliest form of railway. Although modern historians are uncertain as to whether it evolved gradually or was invented at a particular time, it is known that, between the Autumn of 1603 and 1 October 1604, a wagonway had been built near Nottingham, by Huntingdon Beaumont who was the partner of Sir Percival Willoughby, the local land-owner and owner of Wollaton Hall. It ran for approximately two miles (3 km) from Strelley to Wollaton to assist the haulage of coal. No documentary evidence exists to support such statements although Lewis' work (1970) on early wooden railways, and the practicalities of horse haulage, suggest a gauge close to that dimension is plausible.

The above is from Sir Percival Willoughby's agreement with Huntingdon Beaumont dated 1 October 1604. Sir Percival was Lord of the Manor of Wollaton and Huntingdon Beaumont was the lessee of the Strelley coal pits. They worked the Strelley mines in an equal partnership.

Comparatively little is known of the wagonway. It cost £172 (equivalent to £ in ), and ended at Wollaton Lane End, from where most of the coal was taken onwards by road to Trent Bridge and then downstream on the River Trent by barge. The wagons or carriages were drawn by horses on wooden rails. The Strelley mines were worked only until about 1620, by which time all readily recoverable coal had probably been mined. The wagonway was presumably then abandoned.

The success of the Wollaton Wagonway led to Huntingdon Beaumont building other wagonways for his other mining leases near Blyth in Northumberland. A continuous evolution of railways can be traced back to the Wollaton Wagonway.

See also 
Diolkos

References
Notes

Sources
.
.
.
.
.

External links
 Waggonway Research Circle: The Wollaton Wagonway of 1604. The World’s First Overland Railway, August 2005

Rail transport in Nottinghamshire
Railway lines opened in 1604
1604 establishments in England
Horse-drawn railways
History of Nottinghamshire
4 ft 6 in gauge railways in England
Railway lines closed in the 1620s
1620s disestablishments in England